Henry Gascoyen Maurice  (24 May 1874, Marlborough – 12 May 1950) was President of the International Council for the Exploration of the Sea 1920–1938 and President of the Zoological Society of London 1942–1948.  He also headed the Fisheries Department of the Ministry of Agriculture from 1912 and was Fisheries Secretary at the Ministry of Agriculture and Fisheries from 1920 until his retirement in 1938, after which he served on the White Fish Commission from its inception in 1938 until its suspension on the outbreak of war in September 1939.

References 

 
 

1874 births
1950 deaths
Companions of the Order of the Bath
Presidents of the Zoological Society of London
People from Marlborough, Wiltshire
Alumni of Lincoln College, Oxford
Recipients of the Order of Leopold II
British civil servants